The 1926 San Jose State Spartans football team represented State Teachers College at San Jose during the 1926 college football season.

San Jose State competed in the California Coast Conference (CCC). The team was led by third-year head coach Ernesto R. Knollin, and they played home games at Spartan Field in San Jose, California. The team finished the season with a record of one win, six losses and one tie (1–6–1, 0–5–1 CCC). The Spartans were outscored by their opponents 26–120 for the season, and were shut out in five of their eight games.

Schedule

Notes

References

San Jose State
San Jose State Spartans football seasons
San Jose State Spartans football